P.L. Chaturvedi was an Indian academic who served as Chancellor of Central University of Haryana. He was previously the Vice Chancellor of Maharshi Dayanand Saraswati University Ajmer University. 

He was the father of Arun Chaturvedi who is the Social Justice and Empowerment Minister in Rajasthan. And Sanjay Chaturvedi Senior Hospitality professional.his is worked with Tata Sons, Marriott, Oakwood, Claridges Hilton,Hyatt group of hotels. 
He died on 19 December 2020 in the age of 86.
P.L. Chaturvedi had nearly five decades of teaching experience in various colleges in Rajasthan. He was also the National Vice President of All India Universities and Colleges Federation, President of Rajasthan University and College Educational Association, National Vice President of Education Board of India, President of Vidya Bharati Rajasthan and Chairman of Control and Fee Fixation Committee. He also served as the President of Madhya Pradesh Professional College for three years.

References

1934 births
2020 deaths
Academic staff of Maharshi Dayanand Saraswati University
Place of birth missing
People from Jaipur
Academic staff of the Central University of Haryana